Stanley Arthur Radloff (31 July 1919 – 28 May 2009) was  a former Australian rules footballer who played with North Melbourne in the Victorian Football League (VFL).

Prior to playing with North Melbourne, Radloff served in the Australian Army during World War II.

Notes

External links 
		

1919 births
2009 deaths
Australian rules footballers from Melbourne
North Melbourne Football Club players
People from North Melbourne
Australian Army personnel of World War II
Military personnel from Melbourne